Lubsan Sharab Tepkin (1875–1941?) was a Buddhist priest of Kalmyk origin who was born in the Bokshirgankan aimak in the Salsk District of the Don Cossack Host sometime in 1875.

Lubsan Tepkin was born to Dandun Tepkin, a horsebreeder and a member of a prominent family. He joined the Kalmyk clergy at a young age and became Baksha of the khurul in his native aimak by the age of 28 in 1903. In so doing, Lama Tepkin replaced Menko Bormanzhinov who became Lama of the Don Kalmyks. In 1911, Lama Tepkin abdicated his position and moved to Tibet, where he would remain until the fall of 1922.

Lama Tepkin moved to Petrograd, Russia in the fall of 1922 to become a deputy Tibetan envoy and a lecturer in Mongolian and Tibetan at the Leningrad Institute of Oriental Living Languages. Three years later in 1925, Lama Tepkin traveled to the Kalmyk Autonomous Oblast to attend the second conference of the Kalmyk Buddhist clergy where he was elected the Šajin Lama of the Kalmyk people.

Lama Tepkin held the position of Šajin Lama until his arrest by the NKVD in 1931. He was sentenced to imprisonment without a formal trial by an NKVD tribunal. Lama Tepkin reportedly spent the last years of his life working as a clerk on a dairy farm near Tashkent where he was last heard of in 1941.

References
Balinov, Shamba. Genocide in the USSR, Chapter V, Attempted Destruction of Other Religious Groups, The Kalmyk Buddhists, Nikolai Dekker and Andrei Lebed, Editors, Series I, No. 40, Institute for the Study of the USSR, Munich, 1958.
Bormanshinov, Arash. Lama Arkad Chubanov, His Predecessors and Successors, Birchbark Press, College Park, MD 1980.
Bormanshinov, Arash. THE LAMAS OF THE KALMYK PEOPLE: THE DON KALMYK LAMAS, Papers on Inner Asia, No. 18, Research Institute for Inner Asian Studies, Indiana University, Bloomington, 1991.
Poppe, Nicholas N. Genocide in the USSR, Chapter V, Attempted Destruction of Other Religious Groups, The Buddhists, Nikolai Dekker and Andrei Lebed, Editors, Series I, No. 40, Institute for the Study of the USSR, Munich, 1958.

Tibetan Buddhist priests from Kalmykia
1875 births
1941 deaths
Buddhists from the Russian Empire